Chongming-Qidong Yangtze River Bridge or the Chongqi Bridge, also called Chongqi Crossing Project, is a bridge across the north fork of the Yangtze River, near the river's mouth between Chongming Island of Shanghai and Qidong in Jiangsu Province.  This bridge, along with the Shanghai Yangtze River Tunnel and Bridge to the south, forms the last crossing of the Yangtze River before the river empties into the East China Sea.  The bridge carries the six-lane G40 Shanghai–Xi'an Expressway, part of the National Expressway Network of the People's Republic of China.

The bridge connects Chenjia in Chongming County in the south with Qidong in the north, and was built from 2008 to 2011 at cost of RMB8.238 billion. As of December 2011, the bridge was the longest box girder bridge in China. The longest span is 185 meters. Major construction was completed on September 21, 2011 and the bridge opened to commercial traffic on December 24, 2011.

See also
 Yangtze River bridges and tunnels
 Chonghai Bridge

References

External links
Construction to begin on Shanghai-Jiangsu bridge
即时播报：崇启大桥工程报告通过专家组评估
崇启长江公路大桥有望明年开建。

Bridges in Shanghai
Bridges in Jiangsu
Bridges over the Yangtze River
Bridges completed in 2011